Christy Armendariz is a member of the Nebraska Legislature for District 18 from Omaha, Nebraska. She was elected to the Nebraska Legislature on November 8, 2022. Armendariz works as a Strategic Sourcing Specialist for Nebraska Methodist Health System.

Electoral history

References 

Republican Party Nebraska state senators
21st-century American politicians
Living people
Year of birth missing (living people)
21st-century American women politicians
University of Nebraska Omaha alumni